The following is a list of characters from the Japanese manga and anime Black Lagoon.

The Lagoon Company 

The Lagoon Company is a mercenary/pirate group that is the main focus of the series, hired by the many criminal organisations operating in and around Roanapur to locate, acquire and smuggle items by sea.

Rokuro Okajima / Rock 

He is also the narrator in the anime version.

Rock starts out as a 25-year-old Japanese salaryman for Asahi Industries in Tokyo until he is taken hostage by the crew of the Black Lagoon during their raid on the ship he is on. He joins the Lagoon Company after his department chief Kageyama abandons him (Kageyama declares him dead) in an attempt to cover up the smuggling operation in which Rock had been an unwitting participant. Rock is a caring and good-natured everyman despite being on the business end of guns from friend and foe alike, and often seems surprised at the dangers of the Southeast Asian crime world. He still wears his tie, dress shirt, and dress pants because although now a pirate, he still retains his business persona. He prefers to use words over weapons when interacting with others. Rock, after joining the Lagoon company, has wondered if he is experiencing Stockholm syndrome.

Within the Lagoon Company, Rock is usually responsible for account management, diplomacy, negotiation, interpretation, and the occasional errand. Having once worked in the resource investigation department of Asahi Industries, Rock is also skilled in geology. He is also a natural linguist, being effectively bilingual in Japanese, his native language, and English, as well as being familiar with other languages, including Spanish, Romanian, and Russian. He also has a surprisingly high tolerance for alcohol, owing to the heavy-drinking lifestyle of a ladder-climbing salaryman. Rock's charismatic personality has earned him the interest of several figures in Roanapur, including Balalaika, Mr. Chang, Rowan "Jackpot" Pigeon, Yolanda, Eda (who develops a crush on him), and young Garcia Lovelace. In many ways, Rock is the heart of the Lagoon Company, serving as a balance for his more callous teammates and as an average counterbalance in the world of darkness that is Roanapur. Dutch has stated that he believes Lagoon Company is complete with Rock not holding a gun, saying his bullets are the kind to ricochet back at them.

Despite his lack of combat experience, Rock has come through every adventure, kidnapping, and firefight with only a few bruises, surviving personal confrontations with most of Roanapur's most dangerous criminals at some point. Rock eventually begins to enjoy his life as a pirate and becomes even more comfortable with corruption. This comes to the fore when Mr Chang personally enlists Rock to locate Roberta before she is killed by US Special Forces, as he demonstrates a duplicitous, ruthless side of his personality clearly influenced by Revy and Roanapur. He devises a scheme to extract the US soldiers from the city to draw Roberta out, accounting even for Garcia's loyalty, Roberta's psychosis and the personal vendattas amongst the criminals, treating the entire plan like a gambling game. He is forced back towards kindness in the extra missing pages of chapter 76 after an angered Fabiola shoots him with a blank round. In "The Wired Red Wild Card" arc, Rock's ideals and place in Roanapur are further explored as he meets Chinese hacker Feng Yifei and attempts to save her life from assassins without clear gain. She appears attracted to and kisses him.

While Rock has a family in Tokyo, he has little to no connection with them due to their somewhat cold attitude towards him. It is later revealed that he failed to pass his college entrance exams on his first try, leading his family to lower their expectations of him. It is known that he has a father, a mother, and an older brother who was academically capable and thus attained a job in the Japanese government. He was born in the 49th year of the Shōwa period, according to the manga version, which corresponds to 1974.

Revy 

, sometimes referred to by her real name, Rebecca Lee, is the co-protagonist of the series. She does most of the fighting for the Lagoon Company. Very little is revealed about her past. Revy is a Chinese American in her mid to late 20s from Chinatown, Manhattan, near Mott Street, who spent most of her youth as a criminal. Flashbacks throughout the series reveal that she may have honed her skills with firearms by shooting at cans, and that her first murder may have been shooting her physically abusive father as a young teenager. According to CIA agents on Basilan Island, Revy is still regarded as notorious by the NYPD (particularly at the fictional 27th Precinct). Revy is very confident, grumpy, aggressive, cynical, and emotionally unstable. Unlike Rock, she is undiplomatic, believing in the use of brute force and violence to get her way. In contrast to this, she is revealed to be highly ticklish. She is also a heavy smoker and drinker. Of all the characters in the series, Revy is recognized as the most foul-mouthed, yelling constant profanity.

She is a sadistic killer without a conscience who will murder anyone at the slightest provocation, even unarmed civilians. She has a loving but tense attitude towards Rock; she was very hostile towards him at the start of their relationship and nearly killed him at one point during an argument. However, they eventually make amends with each other and she saves his life on a number of occasions, having grown to be very protective of him. It is implied that Revy may be attracted to Rock, based on her reactions to Eda's teasings, which appear to be motivated by jealousy. Her attraction is further suggested in the last scenes of Season 2 when Eda asks her if she has gotten anywhere with Rock; instead of denying it with a short comment as usual, she replies that she'd rather not say, causing Eda to laugh at her hopelessness when it comes to men.

Revy is one of the deadliest fighters in the series, whose skill with firearms and ability to dodge bullets is almost superhuman and unparalleled. There are only a few other characters, such as Roberta and Ginji, that can hold their ground against her in combat. In episode 11 of the first season Revy concedes to Mr. Chang that she does not possess his level of skill but hopes to attain it eventually. Her weapons of choice are a pair of modified Beretta 92FS's; which are made out of stainless steel and had their barrels extended from 4.9" to 5.9" each (the 5.9" is the combat MOD barrel) and also adapted for silencers. They are engraved with the words "9mm Sword Cutlass" on both sides, the Jolly Roger of the pirate Calico Jack (which is also inlaid into the ivory grips), and a manufacturer's inscription in Thai. Due to her ambidextrous marksmanship skills, she is nicknamed "Two Hands" by the denizens of Roanapur, which is based on Douglas E. Winter's novel Run. Revy is also proficient in the use of other weapons, such as high-powered rifles and the M79 grenade launcher. Constantly living on the edge, combined with the tragedies of her past, Revy has developed a rather bleak outlook on life, relying only on her own power, skills, and money.

Dutch 

 is the African American leader of the Lagoon Company and captain of the ex-U.S. Navy PT boat Black Lagoon. Age 40–50, he is a former Marine who fought in the Vietnam War. Shortly before the war ended (presumably in 1973), Dutch went AWOL, escaping to Thailand to work as a mercenary.

Dutch first appears when he scolds Revy for taking Rock as a hostage when she has no real plan for obtaining any ransom. Because of this, Dutch apologizes and tries to take care of Rock until they find a safe place to abandon him. As Rock later proves to be incredibly useful, Dutch allows Revy to invite him into the Lagoon Company. Dutch tends to stay away from the fighting associated with Lagoon Company's activities. Instead, he gives orders and negotiates contracts with clients from the many criminal groups of Roanapur. However, Dutch is very capable in combat, skillfully wielding a Remington 870 Marine Magnum shotgun and a Smith & Wesson 629 revolver. Despite his amoral lifestyle, Dutch is a polite and laid-back character, and most of the time is very considerate. He has a close association with Balalaika of Hotel Moscow, having saved her life during one of Roanapur's gang wars.

His body is heavily muscled, and he is always seen wearing a pair of sunglasses, typically dressed in camouflage pants and wearing a flak jacket. He appears to be in his 30s, but is most likely in his 40s, given his apparent military service in Vietnam and the setting of Black Lagoon in the 1990s. In the "Baile de los Muertos" saga in the manga, it is suggested that Dutch lied about his Vietnam service and could just simply be a mercenary with no past. However, a U.S. soldier advised Benny to be wary of Dutch, because a man like Dutch never lies without a serious reason.

The ongoing arc L'homme sombre, focuses on Dutch's past as a squad of French women try to assassinate him.

Benny 

 is a dropout from the University of Florida where he studied until getting into trouble with the FBI and the mafia. Benny would have ended up dead if Revy and Dutch had not saved him. He works as the Lagoon Company's mechanic, computer specialist, and researcher. He also functions as the Lagoon's driver and appears to be the owner of the 1969 Dodge Coronet R/T (later replaced with a 1965 Pontiac GTO) that Lagoon Company travels around Roanapur in. He is Jewish, or at least of Jewish descent as he puts it, and is often called "Benny-Boy" by Dutch. Benny joined the Lagoon Company two years before Rock after Revy rescued him. Benny has a level-headed and anxiety-free personality. He readily admits to Rock that the two of them are not gunfighters in any way, shape, or form. Unlike Rock, however, Benny is willing to turn a blind eye to Revy and Dutch's barbaric methods. Benny also tends to be possessive of his computers and will not let anyone else touch them. In the second season, he met Greenback Jane and after impressing her with his computer abilities, began an online relationship with her. Jane returns to Roanapur following the teams completion of the Lovelace Incident and Benny meets up with her.

Hotel Moscow 

Hotel Moscow is a branch of the Russian mafia based on Thai soil named after the Hotel Moskva in the Russian capital city of Moscow. The Bougainvillea Trade Company serves as a front for their activities. It is composed of the men who served under Balalaika in the Soviet–Afghan War, who are dedicated to her. They are relatively new to Roanapur, but their brutality, discipline and prior experience make most of the gangsters wary of them.

Balalaika 

 is the boss of Hotel Moscow. Her real name is Sofia Irinovskaya Pavlovna. She was brought up by her grandfather, the military head of the USSR. Before joining the mafia, Balalaika was a captain in the Soviet Army and a Vozdushno-Desantnye Vojska paratrooper who served in the Soviet–Afghan War. A fine marksman and sniper, she was nicknamed "balalaika", one of the Soviet Army's slang terms for the Dragunov sniper rifle. After the collapse of the Soviet Union, Balalaika developed an intense hatred for the corrupt Russian Federation government and its influence over her country. It is because of this Balalaika founded the Russian Mafia outfit Hotel Moscow in 1992. Due to Balalaika's leadership during the hellish fighting in Afghanistan, her men look up to her as their superior and will do just about anything upon her orders. As a combat officer, she is a skilled strategist and well-rounded fighter, capable of taking care of herself despite the fact that all of her troopers, including Boris, often worry about her. Although she has shown herself to be rather cynical on occasion, she is also a pragmatic and professional businesswoman. She frequently employs Dutch and the Lagoon Company, as he saved her life after she was shot by Mr Chang during a gang war. She, along with Mr Chang, are one of the few people that Revy respects, and Revy would affectionately refer to her as "Sis". In turn, Balalaika also seems to hold Rock in high regard, sometimes relying on his knowledge and business skills.

Balalaika can be easily identified by the burn marks which scar most of the right side of her face, neck, and chest which she suffered in Afghanistan, earning her the nickname "Fry-Face" by those who dislike her. She has long blonde hair, and usually wears a military greatcoat, thrown over a low-cut business suit. She smokes cigars, in contrast with the other characters who smoke cigarettes. Based on her service in Afghanistan and the missed opportunity to participate in the 1984 Summer Olympics in Los Angeles due to the Soviet boycott, she is between 31–35 years old.

In critical operations, Balalaika calls upon a personal cadre of ex-Soviet airborne troops and Spetsnaz commandos who are Soviet-Afghan War veterans. Known as the Desantniki, they act as Hotel Moscow's special ops team. She and her men share a strong fellowship and there is a great deal of mutual loyalty between them. It is implied that many of her current operatives served with her in Afghanistan. When conducting foreign operations from Thai soil, she uses the Russian cargo ship Maria Zeleska as a legal cover from the police and various law enforcement agencies. In spite of the fact that Balalaika is on the Interpol list, she uses the pseudonym Vladilena N. Vasilinov in Japan, being covered by diplomatic immunity.

Boris 

 is Balalaika's second-in-command. He can be easily identified by the large scar running from the right side of his forehead to his left cheek. He is a calm, broad-built man with a deep Russian accent. Like Balalaika, he also saw service in Afghanistan. She still refers to him as "Comrade Sergeant" rather than by his name, suggesting that he was her former platoon sergeant. He is very loyal and protective of Balalaika and often worries for her safety when she decides to fight in the field.

The Hong Kong Triad 
The Hong Kong Triad are a branch of the Hong Kong-based Triad stationed in Roanapur. They are led by Mr. Chang, who is a proficient gun fighter in his own right. Chang is more patient than Balalaika in terms of getting into battle. Under his services are Shenhua, who is his top assassin; Sawyer, who does disposal jobs for him frequently despite not being a member of the organization, and Leigharch, who is their getaway driver until recent events prevented him from acting in this capacity.

Mr. Chang 

 is the boss of a Thailand branch of the Sun Yee On Triad. Like Revy, he is adept with dual-wielding pistols (Beretta 76 and AMT Hardballer) in a fashion similar to that of gun fu, the former of which are inscribed with a Chinese symbol, meaning "Heavenly King", on the grips. Chang is far more proficient in this dual-wielding gunfighting style than Revy, who, in episode 11, freely admits that she is "not on his level yet". It may be this prowess in combat that makes Chang the only male whom Revy respectfully refers to as "Sir".

He has a deep respect for Balalaika (who annoys him by referring to him as "Babe"), though their beliefs are known to collide. Their relationship is almost playful in a business sort of way, which began after they survived a shootout with each other. They both recognise they would make a strong partnership in crime, but choose not to because it would make their respective lives boring. Chang is rather amused at Rock's "unique" way of handling things. Unlike most criminal bosses in the town, he advocates cooperation and joint ventures to keep the status quo in Roanapur, knowing outside interference would see all the criminals lose. A conversation with Eda just before Roberta's second rampage reveals Chang is in fact secretly backed by the CIA, being permitted to continue his criminal activities in exchange for keeping Roanapur relatively peaceful.

Chang seems easily amused, and unusually-easygoing and lighthearted, especially given his position. This might be attributed to the fact that he was once a member of law enforcement, which he reveals after being called 'an inhuman scumbag' by Rock and laughing out loud in response, and he might very well be seeing his current position as an ironic twist of fate. The only time he is shown to be truly angry is when Eda (disguising her voice) taunts him about the USA's influence and the fact he has no choice but to cooperate with them.

His past as law enforcer may explain his combat expertise. Chang manages to survive a shootout with Balalaika, escape from ambush of superior number of Islamic front jihadists, and disarm Fabiola easily. His expertise is often overshadowed by his easygoing character, in comparison with the ill-tempered Revy and near-psychotic Roberta.

Mr. Chang is based on characters commonly played by Chow Yun-fat in films by John Woo, such as John Lee in Replacement Killers and especially Mark Gor in A Better Tomorrow, as both Chang and Mark Gor are members of the Hong Kong Triads, wield dual pistols and don similar attire.

Shenhua 

 is a Taiwanese assassin in the employ of Mr. Chang. She prefers to use various edged weapons in close combat, in particular a pair of Kukri knives linked together with a length of leather rope at the handles, thus using them as modified rope darts. She is also skilled in the use of throwing knives. Shenhua is a professional rival of Revy (who refers to her as "Chinglish" in the anime and "Yes Lady" in the manga; in return Shenhua calls Revy "Twinkie" in the anime (yellow on the outside (Chinese) and white on the inside), whom she has worked with and against at times. Her personal religion is Taoism. However, she tells Eda in episode 18 that she is an atheist, but this was due to a mistranslation in the English dubbed anime. One of her most notable traits is her broken speech pattern, which is always moving between Chinese and English. She is last seen being helped to walk by Lotton (who says that he will take her to a doctor, despite her having suffered what she believes to be a fatal wound) after being shot by Eda while hunting for Greenback Jane. In the El Baile de la Muerte arc, she is revealed to have survived the battle when Revy is shown calling her on the phone. She agrees to take up Revy's offer to help Garcia fight off the Colombian Cartel who is trying to kill Roberta. She showed her first glimpse of fear when in close range combat with Roberta when she managed to catch one of Shenhua's kukri in her teeth and shattered the blade to pieces.

It is unknown if Shenhua has any unarmed hand-to-hand skills, as she fights only with blades and never engages anyone in hand-to-hand combat. The only other person who does this is Sawyer the Cleaner, who frequently works with her in "disposal" jobs.

Leigharch 

 is an Irish getaway driver who worked with Shenhua during the incident involving the Islamic Liberation Front. A compulsive user of marijuana, he has a distressingly frequent tendency to hallucinate at inopportune times, such as in the middle of a car chase. Most of his hallucinations are actually references to Western pop culture, such as Playmates, Star Trek characters like Jean-Luc Picard and Klingons, or 1960s rock music such as Jimi Hendrix. Leigharch is said by Shenhua during the Greenback Jane incident to have suffered a massive overdose (he "couldn't get back from Mars"), inducing psychological damage severe enough to commit him to full-time medical attention. Despite his drug addiction and hallucinations, he was still considered a skilled driver before his overdose.

The Colombian Cartel 
The Colombian cartel noted in this section is separate from the Manisalera Cartel which was originally responsible for Garcia Lovelace's kidnapping and was subsequently wiped out by Roberta and Balalaika who seems to have since taken over their territory. Along with the Italian Mafia, they are the most brash of the criminal organizations, much to the disgust of Balalaika and Chang. Just them barely appearing often results in needless fighting and bloodshed. They are led by Abrego, who is somewhat of a coward and usually travels with his men. Lately, they have been made a fool of in the criminal underworld because of the Lovelace Family and their two killer maids. While the Italians do it for profit, the Cartels do it as a sense of pride, which usually gets them into unwanted trouble. It is revealed that they had a hand in the assassination of Diego Lovelace.

Abrego 

 is a Colombian drug cartel boss operating in Roanapur. Whilst very arrogant, he has a tendency to be cowardly. He was presumed dead after the South American maid Roberta detonated a bomb in the bar he was in, although his appearance in later episodes is evidence that he somehow survived. After the explosion and the loss of many of his gunmen, Abrego's influence in Roanapur seems to have fallen, judging from the attitude he takes from Balalaika, Chang and Verrocchio. He is once again made a fool of, this time by Fabiola.

Ever since the incident with Roberta, the Cartel had tried numerous times to figure out where she was hiding; fortunately for Roberta, through her connection with the Lovelace family, Roberta was protected daily by local police and military forces. Thus, the Cartel couldn't even touch her without causing an incident. Currently, he sends for many FARC soldiers to assist the cartel in finding Roberta; however, much of the FARC has been suspicious of the cartel's action and even threatened to betray them.

Gustavo 
Voiced by: Paul Dobson (English)

 is one of Abrego's main henchmen. At first, he is seen doing simple tasks for Abrego, such as disposal jobs, early in the series. Recently, he's been assigned to track down Roberta after hearing rumors of her returning to the city by other groups, including the police, Triad, and Hotel Moscow. He, along with some men, search for Roberta throughout the city and meets up with Revy and Rock. He then explains the situation within the Cartel regarding Roberta. He then crosses paths with Fabiola, who is requesting the aid of Lagoon Company. Fabiola is threatened by him and his men, as Revy then instigates a fight between them, resulting in a comical argument between him and Bao over the use of the telephone, much to Revy's amusement. In desperation, he tries to call Abrego, who is out with a girl according to his subordinates. He calls all of them in to warn them of another maid who is as fierce as Roberta. Finally, he orders the total destruction of the Yellow Flag, much to Bao's anger as the Yellow Flag is demolished again. He is left behind by his men after Fabiola scares them off. Because of his failure, Abrego has ordered him to be killed on sight. He is later seen at Abrego's side during a meeting with the other gangs, perhaps Abrego becomes aware with heavy losses he caused.

Other Roanapur gangsters

Verrocchio 

 is the boss of a branch of the Italian mafia based in Thailand. He is belligerent, impatient, and spiteful, yelling at and beating up his men if dare they speak out and calling Balalaika "Fry-Face" in front of her during the meeting between the gangs. He once attempted to use the child assassins, Hänsel and Gretel, to kill the rival gang leaders, including Balalaika and Mr. Chang, in an attempt to seize complete leadership of Roanapur's criminal underworld. Verrocchio was killed when Hänsel and Gretel turned against him on a murderous whim.

Ronny the Jaws 

Ronny the Jaws is Verrocchio's replacement as the Italian Mafia's boss after his death at the hands of the twins. He wears braces; hence his name. His real name was unknown until Chapter 79. Balalaika calls him by the derogatory slang "Dago" prior to this. He seems to have a cooler head than Verrocchio but is still plenty arrogant and foolish. Balalaika and Chang seem to dislike him and his immature way of handling serious business. He doesn't hold much respect for Abrego either and treats him rudely despite being the newest amongst members of those holding the most power in Roanapur. Revy says his group is almost as vicious as Hotel Moscow and he appears to have an alliance with the Albanian Mafia.

Chen 

 was a Chinese crime boss whose business suffered as a result of Hotel Moscow recently muscling into Roanapur. He is quite cowardly, and Dutch had already stopped taking him seriously after he pulled out of a previous contract he had made with the Lagoon Company. After unsuccessfully trying to intimidate Dutch into ending his contracts with Hotel Moscow, he has a proxy hire Lagoon Company for a job and then sends the pirate gang of Luak to ambush them, but Revy and Dutch wipe out the entire fleet. Chen, having bragged about his plan to most of Roanapur, is then located by Hotel Moscow and murdered; they tie him to a chair in his apartment and blow it up using plastic explosives and gasoline.

Luak 

 is the captain of a Vietnamese pirate gang that operated in the rivers and seas of Thailand, mostly composed by former Việt Cộng defectors. He was contracted by Chen to kill off the Lagoon Company when Dutch wouldn't accept Chen over Balalaika. Luak's gang ambushed the Black Lagoon, but the entire gang was wiped out by Revy and Dutch. Revy is seen to fire a round from an M79 grenade launcher into his boat at the end of the fight destroying it, so he is presumed dead.

The Church of Violence/The Rip-Off Church 
The Church of Violence is a drugs and weapon smuggling operation located in Roanapur. The church is notorious for its double dealings. Using their front as a Christian church, their main business is illegal imports, mainly firearms. However, they are known to import other items, including drugs, which seems to offend Balalaika as it is bad for their business. So far they have consistently outsmarted Hotel Moscow in terms of imports. Dutch refers them as "The Rip-Off Church" due to the group charging heavily on goods, especially those needed for missions. Rock has been able to arrange proper business deals with the Church. The Church is always money-hungry and are known to do double-dealings, much to the disgust of Revy.

Eda 

 is a woman posing as a nun in the Rip-Off Church, with ties to the underground, since the convent is mainly a smuggling organization. About 30 years old, she is friends with Revy and often drinks with her in the Rip-off Church, but this does not prevent them from confronting each other, as they share the same hotheaded personality. She has taken a liking to Rock during the "Second Barrage" episodes, and makes fun of Revy by threatening to take Rock for herself. She often calls Rock "Romeo".

Eda has blond hair, blue eyes, and wears angular pink sunglasses even with her nun's habit, and is often seen either chewing gum or smoking. Before she came to work for the Church, she claimed to be from Langley, Virginia. Langley, Virginia, is a metonym for the CIA as its headquarters is located there. Later on, it is revealed that Eda is an operative for the CIA and is being hosted by the Church of Violence in return for monetary payments. She is given an assignment by the CIA to track down Grey Fox, the same foe Roberta is hunting as they are a threat to her CIA division. Using a voice changer inside a mobile, Eda acts as an anonymous handler for Mr. Chang, providing him with intelligence about Grey Fox's mission to capture a major figure in the Triad's drug manufacturing operation. Chang is aggravated by the way he is being manipulated, but Eda mocks him as just a "two-bit thug" compared to the USA. Rock is perhaps the only person in Roanapur who openly suspects who Eda might be working for.

Eda's preferred firearm is a Glock 17L (as seen in manga chapter 41), which she wields proficiently, despite Revy's claims that she is a "second-rate gunman".

She apparently was loosely modeled after the character Thana from Ms. 45.

Eda's story is further expanded in her own spin-off manga, a prequel that chronicles her CIA work prior to arriving in Roanapur.

Yolanda 

 is the leader of The Rip-Off Church. She appears to be quite old and wears an eyepatch over her right eye. Despite her age and gentle appearance, she leads her organization with an iron fist. As the head of her organization, Yolanda usually never fights, leaving this job to gunmen like Eda and Rico. However, she does carry a customized golden Desert Eagle and uses it without hesitation in due course, such as in chapter 38 of the manga. She can fire the Desert Eagle one-handed and with deadly accuracy, seemingly unaffected by the gun's infamous weight and heavy recoil. Her looks could be based on Mother Angelica, a real-life Roman Catholic nun who, at one time, wore an eyepatch over her left eye. Yolanda is usually stern with Eda drinking alcohol in the church and seems to love tea. After an intelligent conversation with Rock, who convinces her to make a deal with Lagoon Company, she is impressed by his abilities and credits Dutch for finding someone as rare as him. She refers to Revy as "Rebecca" and tells her that she might learn a thing or two from Rock. She has connections with all the criminal organization in terms of intelligence, and though not officially part of the CIA, she serves as Eda's informant and confidant. She gives Eda fair warning that her opponent is no rookie and that she should be careful.

Rico 

 (Ricardo) is an apprentice priest in the Rip-Off Church. Like Eda and Yolanda, he is a highly skilled gunman whose choice of weapon is a M60 machine gun. He refers to Eda as "Big sis" ("Ane-san" in Japanese) instead of "Sister", much to her chagrin.

Citizens of Roanapur

Bao 

 is the bartender and owner of the Yellow Flag bar, which he named in honor of the former South Vietnam flag. He is an ex-ARVN soldier who fought in the Vietnam War. He often feels harassed by Lagoon Company, especially Revy, for messing up his bar whenever they get into a fight with another party and reminds Revy to pay for the damage she has caused, which she always avoids doing. Balalaika seems to cover the repairs after Roberta destroyed it, which implies that the bar may be owned by Hotel Moscow. Seen as a great hang-out by most of the residents as it give many "jobs" to locals. After being rebuilt, he calls the Lagoon Company to tell them that Roberta is back in town. When Revy and Rock arrive along with Gustavo, they all meet up with Fabiola. After some words, Revy instigates a fight between Gustavo and Fabiola leading once again to the destruction of his bar. Bao claims that his bar has been destroyed more than 15 times, most of it done by Revy.

Flora 
Madame Flora is the morbidly obese madam of the "Sloppy Swing", a brothel located on the top floor of Bao's bar. She took a liking to Rock and offered to "service him herself" (were she a bit younger).

Rowan "Jackpot" Pigeon 

 is the owner and manager of the GoofFest strip club on Rachiada Street in Roanapur. Of African-American descent, he has employed Revy as an S/M dancer once in the past, possibly putting her as a dominatrix. He has stated, however, that she "could give it and take it", implying that Revy could also have been the submissive. This is changed in the anime, with Rowan consistently asking Revy to join his BDSM show when she comes to his place, but with her expressing disgust at the idea. He is also a movie dealer who carries both legal and illegal genres (such as all forms of pornography and snuff films). He is extremely frightened of Hotel Moscow, especially of Balalaika.

Chief Watsup 

 is the chief of the  Roanapur police force. He receives a regular stipend from Roanapur's criminal cartels, as well as the Lagoon Company, to stay away from their illegal activities. It is implied throughout the series that Revy tends to cause a lot of trouble in public and he usually has to bail her out much to his chagrin. He gets used to Revy's trouble making and he and Revy became sort of friends. For the most part, Watsup upholds this deal as long as his benefactors do not cause public incidents. He has dealt with Balalaika on more than one occasion, although she detests him for reasons unknown.

Bounty hunters and mercenaries

The Captain 

The Captain is the rank of an unknown mercenary in the employ of the Extra Order Company, a fictional private military company similar to modern day Blackwater Worldwide and the now defunct Executive Outcomes, where the initials EO come from. An experienced ex-soldier who saw action in the Liberian civil war in the early 1990s, Captain had no qualms with killing anyone he was asked to kill. He was also something of a challenge-seeker, since he wanted to prolong his fight with the Lagoon Company, whom he saw as worthy opponents. This proved to be his undoing however, since Rock realized this and came up with a strategy to exploit Captain's attitude. While attacking the Black Lagoon head-on in a Mil Mi-24, the boat launched itself off a sunken ship and fired two torpedoes that brought down the Captain's helicopter, one hitting him in the face before detonating.

Sawyer the Cleaner 

, also known as Sawyer the Cleaner, is a young girl, appearing to be in her late teens-early twenties, who specializes in body disposal, but also does occasional bounty hunter work. She is the person that the Triads turn to execute people in the most brutal ways possible, usually to serve as examples for their clientele and enemies. Her legitimate business front is, fittingly, a meat packing business named "U.G. Pork".

Sawyer works in a white-tiled room, which is covered in blood from her various executions, and uses a chainsaw as her tool of trade. When on the job, she is dressed like a surgeon, but otherwise she wears gothic clothing. Few people seem to recognize her when she is not wearing her surgeon's robes. Because her throat had been cut open at some point, she speaks with an Ultravoice. Upon losing the Ultravoice, she is shown to become extremely emotionally distressed and drops into a fetal position.

Like Shenhua, Sawyer is an assassin who eschews the use of firearms in combat. Instead, she utilizes a thick-bladed chainsaw over half-her-height long, the same one she uses on her victims. The size and build of the weapon allows her to deflect rapid gun-fire with horrifying ease, although this can still push her back.

Much like Roberta, Sawyer is presented as an "unstoppable" attacker, much in the manner of Leatherface from The Texas Chainsaw Massacre, where she will cut through any obstacle in her path while stalking her prey, and the fact she enjoys her work immensely makes her even more dangerous. Her name may also be a homage to the Sawyer family of that film series and when she realized she had lost her Ultravoice in episode 18 she briefly reenacts Leatherface's "chainsaw dance" of rage. Strangely, she is one of the few bounty hunters to survive the manhunt on Jane, and is later seen doing some "cleanup" work on a Roanapur side street in the morning. She worked with Shenhua and Lotton in helping Garcia fight off the Colombian Cartel, who were trying to kill Roberta. She also seems to have replaced her hand held Ultravoice with a wraparound version of the device that can be worn around her neck. Just like Shenhua, she first showed her fear of Roberta after their first encounter when Roberta managed to stop and break the chain of Sawyer's chainsaw with her guns.

She does not only do disposal jobs, but also cleaning jobs for hotel rooms. When she forgets her Ultravoice, she requests someone to translate for her and draws descriptions on a window or on a person's back to "speak". Given the chance to explain, she's extremely graphic about the details of her profession to the point those around her tell her to stop being descriptive. Despite the gruesome nature of her job, Sawyer seems to have a rather happy, yet morbid demeanor at times. In chapter 78 when she explained to Rock that he touched a mattress that had absorbed the bodily fluids of the corpses that died 14 days prior in the hotel room he, Benny, Jane and Feng Yifei were staying in, Sawyer has a blissful expression while everyone else vomits at this information.

Claude "Torch" Weaver 

 is a heavyset, middle-aged man with blonde hair and glasses and always sports a grin with a look of an archetypical everyman. As his nickname would suggest, he is a pyromaniac who uses a lighter shaped-and-sized flamethrower as his weapon of choice, although for heavy-duty jobs, he will also use a full-sized flamethrower. In spite of his profession and the fact he burnt his own wife to death (which he claims took five minutes), Weaver claims to be religious (which religion is unknown) and is a teetotaler. He is one of the few characters in the series that does not use foul language, preferring to speak with euphemisms (such as "darn" or "shucks") instead. He also moves fast for a man of his weight, being able to keep up with Revy's movements. 

He is introduced in the Yellowflag Bar drinking milk in a separate table with Lotton the Wizard, being one of the many other assassins hired by Russell to assassinate Revy, Rock, and Eda and capture Greenback Jane. He later arrives at the warehouse, where he confronts and attacks Jane while Rock, Revy, and Eda are fighting Sawyer and Shenhua. He then blocks the entrance leading to the docks using his flamethrower before burning down the entire warehouse in an attempt to kill his targets, only for them to escape. He and the remaining bounty hunters later chase them down to the Black Lagoon, where he takes on Revy himself. He is then blown up by her when he is thrown out of side of the ship.

Lotton the Wizard 

 is a mysterious-looking man and one of the bounty hunters hired to capture "Greenback" Jane. He has silver hair, wears a black trenchcoat and shaded glasses, and speaks in a light voice. His weapon of choice is one or more Mauser C96(s) with an extended magazine, although it's unknown whether this is an actual Mauser or a foreign version of the gun. He does not drink alcohol (he claims he's allergic to it). He gets shot by Revy when he tries to make a fancy entrance. It is implied that he is not a mighty fighter, but a poser. However, he did survive a fall from atop a warehouse building after getting shot due to his Kevlar vest, so the full extent of his abilities is still in question. He worked with Sawyer and Shenhua in helping Garcia fight off the Colombian Cartel, who were trying to kill Roberta.

He is also one of the few bounty hunters to survive the manhunt for Jane. After the battle takes off in the sea, he gets up and aids a gravely wounded Shenhua and Sawyer. Due to the uncommon act of kind-heartedness, Shenhua comments that he is not the type to kill and would be better as a host in a bordello, but Lotton claims that he is too clumsy for that. He is seen playing video games with Sawyer at Shenhua's residence in chapter 57 of the manga (as well as the OVA). Revy refers him as being more of a gigolo than a gunman; in addition, Revy forgets that she shot Lotton during the Greenback Jane incident (she shot him on reflex) causing Shenhua and Sawyer to mock her intelligence.

Major Shane Caxton 

 is an American black-ops operator hiding in Roanapur, awaiting deployment into Indochina. Like Dutch, Caxton is a Vietnam War veteran who still holds on to his moral code of conduct. Caxton's team, called "Gray Fox", under orders from a division of the NSA, orchestrated the assassination of Garcia Lovelace's father. Then were then dispatched to Roanapur in order to infiltrate the Golden Triangle and capture a key player who have tie with Khun Sa in the drug trade for trial in the US. However, he and is men are tracked by the formidable Roberta, and their conflict draws in all the major players in Roanapur, including the Triad, Hotel Moscow, and the Church of Violence. When he meets up with Lagoon Company, he automatically recognizes Dutch and mentions something to Dutch that seemed to shock him.

He is held in high esteem by his colleagues, especially Gray Fox's second in command, for his integrity and honorable conduct, being the ideal symbol of America in the story. In a flashback, he executed one of his subordinates, Larkin, in retaliation for murdering innocent women and trying to rape a young girl during the Vietnam War. He also protects Garcia Lovelace as he and his team are escaping from Hotel Moscow. After escaping Roanapur and deploying to capture a drug baron in the Golden Triangle, his men are ambushed by Roberta, but he is actually shot by Garcia himself, who wants to end Roberta's rampage. It is later shown the gun was filled with blanks, a plan devised to snap Roberta out of her bloodlust and save her life.

Ultimately, Caxton is willing to shoot one of his own men to protect Roberta, helping to save her from herself as atonement for his sin against the Lovelace family. In the anime, he is later shown visiting Roberta and Garcia at the Lovelace estate along with the family of a Japanese man she had once executed, presumably to help her make amends.

Bren the Black Death 
Bren the Black Death runs a murder for hire business. According to Revy, he has an office in Roanapur but rarely does jobs there because of overlapping contracts. Roberta hires him to gather a team to attack Grey Fox to drive them out into the open. He sends in a group of hired guns knowing very well that they will be slaughtered by the trained soldiers. He then kills the one survivor himself.

Filano 
Filano is a young man with round glasses who works for Bren the Black Death. He is seen observing the battle between the Grey Foxes and Roberta. He says he prefers to kill with an ordinary object or with nothing at all, as he considers guns to be the lowest form of killing, and is particularly fond of pushing people downstairs or in front of trains to make their deaths look like an accident. He likes to play first person shooters and watches anime, as shown when he watches Speed Racer on his on portable television. He is a manga-exclusive character.

U-1324 Crew and Passengers 
The following are the crew members and passengers of the U-1324:

Lieutenant Commander Wentzel Ahbe 

 was the decorated skipper of the Type IXC U-boat U-1324 and a survivor of the Battle of the Atlantic. His last order in the closing months of World War II in Europe was to take the U-1324 and its veteran crew along with two passengers from the Kriegsmarine naval base at Kiel to ostensibly return Lt. Col. Matsuda to Batavia. He succeeded in getting safely to the Indian Ocean, but ran into trouble with US Navy destroyers near the Nicobar Islands on March 25, 1945, which succeed in fatally crippling the U-1324 with depth charges, leaving it stranded on the seafloor. With only two hours of air left, he relieved his crew of their military duties and allowed them to face death however they chose. Ahbe was a patriot, but he despised the Nazi cause, expressing his bitterness to the SS Lieutenant Colonel that the Nazis had brought Germany to ruin and satisfaction that U-1324's sinking had meaning if his children would never see the Nazi flag again, leading the latter to shoot him. In their last act of loyalty to their captain, his crew avenged him. Ahbe left behind a wife and two children.

His Knight's Cross with Oak Leaves and Swords is sought after by Revy after she and Rock recover The Twelve Knights Led by Brunhilda for its value on the open market. Ahbe is also shown to have received the Iron Cross 1st Class among his other decorations.

He is apparently modeled after Jürgen Prochnow's character from Das Boot.

Lieutenant Colonel Matsuda 

Lieutenant Colonel Matsuda was an Imperial Japanese Army officer posted to Germany to study aeronautics, where he remained until the early part of 1945. Returning him to Japanese-held Batavia is the apparent final mission of the U-1324. He formed a fast friendship with Captain Ahbe and was sociable with the crew, engaging them in games of shogi during the voyage from Kiel to Batavia. When the U-1324 was fatally depth charged and runs aground on the seabed near the Nicobar Islands, he committed seppuku (ritual suicide) using his katana. He does not appear in the manga.

Matsuda is based on the Imperial Japanese Navy lieutenant commander Genzo Shoji, who was posted to Germany to study aeronautics as well, and tried to return to Japan as a passenger of U-234. However, when Germany surrendered in the midst of the voyage, the captain of U-234 decided to surrender to the U.S. Navy. Consequently, Shoji committed seppuku—suicide—to avoid capture. This episode was turned into the movie Das Letzte U-Boot in Germany in 1990.

SS Lieutenant Colonel Spielberger 

SS Lieutenant Colonel (Obersturmbannführer)  was the U-1324's second passenger.  A member of the SD, he was charged with the care of the painting The Twelve Knights Led by Brunhilda, which is part of a Nazi plot to prepare for the Nazis' eventual return to power following their defeat in World War II.

He boarded the U-1324 the night before it sailed. Unlike Lt. Col. Matsuda, he was not as sociable, tending to keep to himself belowdecks, even when the U-boat was safely cruising on the surface in daytime. Like Captain Ahbe he also had a family, a wife and child in Stuttgart, but unlike the former, was more focused on the failure of his mission rather than on them in his final hours. Ahbe's anti-Nazi comments infuriated him, leading him to fatally shoot the captain. About to then shoot himself, he decided to take down as many of the U-1324's crewmembers as possible in his final moments when they avenged their captain's murder.

Aryan Socialist Union 
The Aryan Socialist Union is a group of aspiring Neo Nazis styling themselves along the lines of the Nazi Sturmabteilung. They have a large arsenal of weapons such as MAC-10 machine pistols, MG3 machine guns, AK47 assault rifles, Luger, MP5 Sub-Machineguns, and double-action trigger-outfitted Colt 45 pistols and even TOW Anti-Tank Missiles.

However, they do not realize that they have been lied to and are being set up by Sir Alfred, the head of the Neo Nazi movement, who believes they are a waste. There are more than 30 of them aboard their recovery ship, along with seemingly innocent hostages used to pilot the ship. It is unknown how many, if any, survived the conflict with the Lagoon Company.

Ratchman 

 is a short, fat man who leads the Aryan Socialist Union. He and his men are sent to retrieve a painting that was supposedly painted by Hitler and will reunite the Nazis and return them back to their former glory. He hopes that, by obtaining the painting, he will have proven himself and his men loyal enough to be accepted into the Neo-Nazi underworld. Though he shows loyalty on the surface, he is a coward at heart. Ratchman's lack of foresight and proper planning enables the Lagoon Company to sneak onto the ASU's recovery ship and launch a surprise attack while his men are drunk from celebrating after they recover the painting. He is murdered by Revy and Dutch.

Gruppenführer 

The  is the commander of the Aryan Socialist Union's Suicide Corps. He is the only man, other than Ratchman, to get emotionally worked up over the latter's bombastic pronouncement of his mission. Feller leads his men down to the U-1324 using a special diving pod to connect with the U-boat's hatch. Getting caught up in a firefight with Revy, he is the only member of his team to set foot in the U-1324 to make it out alive, recovering the painting in the process.

When Revy and Dutch assault the Aryan Socialist Union aboard their recovery ship, he attempts to arm himself with a MG42 to fight back, but is shot in the back by Revy in the ship's magazine. In the manga, he is last seen fighting Revy inside the submarine; his fate afterwards is unknown.

Fritz Stanford 

 is the Captain of the Nazi boat that is sent to obtain the World War II  painting in the sunken U-boat. He is a physically huge man, and is filled with blind faith and overconfidence. In the end, it is this overconfidence that gets him killed when he brags about his weapon and threatens Revy (as she slowly reloads her weapon), who shoots him in the chest and then point blank in the head, mostly just to shut him up. He wields a large gold Luger chambered for the .454 Casull cartridge.

Sir Alfred 

He is an elderly man, most likely in his 80s, since he was in the SS during the war, and it is implied that he is a combat veteran. Sir Alfred sets up a test of loyalty and ability for Ratchman and his Aryan Socialist Union, in which he purposely sends them to face-off with the Lagoon Company. Even though he sets them up, he already knows that Ratchman will most likely be defeated. Ratchman and the Lagoon Company are unaware that they are being set up. Sir Alfred feels that Ratchman and his men are idiots and a disgrace to call themselves Nazis, seeing their easy defeat by a group of "racially inferior" members as proof of their incompetence in his view. He even thanks Dutch and Revy for killing them off for him, and even harbours an amount of respect for Dutch, despite being a black man. Dutch later finds out that the Spaniard who hired him was in fact The Boss setting him up.

Protectors of the Islamic Front 
The Protectors of the Islamic Front is a Jihadist group based in South East Asia.

Masahiro Takenaka 

 is a co-leader of the terrorist group "Protectors of the Islamic Front" and a patient, sociable person who rarely loses his cool. Despite being involved with an Islamic terrorist group, he himself is an atheist. Born in the Adachi ward in Tokyo, Masahiro was once an enthusiastic activist for human rights before joining the Japanese Red Army during the Cold War. Later, he was forced to evade arrest by hiding overseas after most of its members were arrested; and it was the time he traveled to Bekaa, Lebanon, that he met Ibraha. Takenaka is based on the Japanese Red Army member Kozo Okamoto.

Ibraha 

 is a co-leader of the "Protectors of the Islamic Front", leading one of its main cells in the Philippines. He is a Lebanese, and is resolute in his hatred of Israel, as his son was killed by Israeli soldiers in Beirut, Lebanon in 1987, after which he dedicated his life to destroying the West. Compared to Takenaka, he is the exact opposite in personality. While chasing Revy, Rock, and Shenhua towards a Basilan military base, he is shot and killed by Takenaka for refusing to pull their forces back for a retreat.

The Washimine Group 
Balalaika came to Japan to work out a deal with the Washimine group to expand their influence in Japan in exchange for helping them weaken a rival Yakuza group, the Kousa Council. However, when Hotel Moscow's methods went too far, Tsugio Bando, the current head of the Washimine group, tried to stop them and was killed by Balalaika, who decided she would instead destroy both groups and take over their operations. Following his death, Ryuzo's daughter was put in charge. In the end, the entire Washimine group, and family, were wiped out along with the Kousa Council.

Yukio Washimine 

 is a high school senior and the only daughter of Ryuzo Washimine, who was the former kumicho (boss) of the yakuza organization "Washimine-gumi" (Washimine Group). She has a chance meeting with Rock and Revy when they come to Tokyo in the employ for Hotel Moscow. Her discussions with Rock lead him to think he might return to an ordinary life, although things soon turn dark when Rock learns that she was born into the Washimine Group. Having lived a normal life free of conflict, she learns that she is the only possible leader of her father's crime family, as the Kousa Council refused to allow anyone other than a blood relative take over. When her bodyguard and unspoken love Ginji resolves to fight "Hotel Moscow", she decides join him, assuming the mantle of leader. She falls, seemingly inevitably, into the world of the yakuza, although Rock desperately tries to persuade her to walk away. She initially claims her actions are to uphold the honour of the Washimine Group, but in reality she believes this is the only way she can be with Ginji. In her spare time, Yukio enjoyed reading a wide variety of books, particularly those concerning philosophy (she is once seen reading a book written by Martin Heidegger). She commits suicide with Ginji's sword after he is killed by Revy. Thoughtful, intelligent and talented, the misfortune of being the only heir to the Washimine group proved too much to bear.

Ginji Matsuzaki 

 is the acting wakagashira (underboss) of Washimine Group, and is Yukio's most loyal and humble personal body guard, and possibly love interest. He works as a street stall vendor, but was formerly an assassin nicknamed "Hitokiri Ginji" (Manslayer Ginji) due to his use of a katana in combat, serving the Washimine until the death of his leader, who was also Yukio's father. His skills with his blade are exceptional, manifesting themselves in such feats as cleaving bullets in two in midflight. Coupled with his ability to evade gunfire from multiple foes, Ginji almost completely eschews the use of firearms. He and Yukio quietly share an unspoken love, but neither choose to act upon it.

Ginji had protected Yukio for a long time and hoped that she would live a normal life despite her family's criminal background. He seems to regret his past as a murderer, and is unwilling to take up arms again until his friend and former leader Tsugio Bando is killed by Hotel Moscow. Ginji attacks the Japanese branch of the Russian Mafia to hunt down Balailaka, though he changes targets when the Washimine enforcer Chaka goes rogue and kidnaps Yukio. He briefly allied with Revy and Rock to rescue her, massacring Chaka's henchmen before cutting off the enforcer's hands and drowning him in a pool. Ginji then assists Yukio in her efforts to avenge the slaughter of her clan, and they capture Rock so that he can lead them to Hotel Moscow's base. However, Revy catches up with them, prompting Ginji to face her in a duel.

Ginji comes within inches of killing Revy, shattering her cutlass and stabbing her. However, he is distracted by Yukio's admission of love at the last moment; he only manages to put his sword through her leg as she shoots him in the throat. Revy comments that this hesitation was all that stopped Ginji killing her.

Although Revy calls Ginji "Jumbo" because of his height, the name "Jumbo" may also refer to Takashi Takeda (AKA "Jumbo") from the Yotsuba&! manga series with whom he shares an uncanny resemblance.

Tsugio Bando 

 is the wakagashira (underboss) of the Washimine Group. Since the position of boss of the Washimine Group is left vacant by the death of the former boss Ryuzo Washimine, Yukio's father, Tsugio is the actual boss of the Washimine Group. Tsugio is very loyal to the memory of Ryuzo, who had protected him after he just arrived in Tokyo from Osaka. Due to his hate of the Kousa Council's ill-treatment of the Washimine Group, he allied with Hotel Moscow for a short time in order for his group to rise and make a name for itself. However, his plans and Hotel Moscow's completely differed in approach as Balalaika was more brutal in her methods, much to the dismay of Bando. He is killed in a desperate attempt to assassinate Balalaika and protect the Washimine Group, Balalaika easily dodging his attempt to stab her and then breaking his neck, before sending back to the Washimine the suitcase including his body.

Yoshida 

 is one of the enforcers working for the Washimine Group. He was very loyal to Tsugio Bando and refers to him as an older brother. Yoshida is usually seen as a bodyguard for Tsugio, and later Yukio when she inherits the leadership of the Washimine Group. During Yukio's inheritance of the Washimine Group's head position, it was Yoshida who rallied support for the young lady. While taking Yukio home, he is shot by Chaka, who is planning to kidnap her. Telling Yukio to escape, Yoshida is repeatedly gunned down before Chaka and his gang gives chase.

Chaka 

 is one of the enforcers working for the Washimine Group who fancies himself as a "Wild West" gunman and is fluent in English. Arrogant, cruel, and sadistic, Chaka is often seen as an idiot by his peers. Prior to his betrayal, he was in charge of a strip bar that the Washimine Group owned. His earlier appearance showed that Revy's reputation as a gunman in Roanapur is such that even the yakuza in Japan have heard of her. He wields a Ruger Blackhawk, which he frequently uses in gratuitous moments of violence.

He is introduced interrupting an important meeting shouting at his girlfriend on the phone. After the meeting, he later beats up Rock when he intervenes between him making passes at Revy, much to her ire. Shortly after Yukio becomes the boss of the Group, Chaka makes his bid to take over the leadership by kidnapping her with the help of a street gang, planning to sell her to sex slavery. His actions manage to catch the attention of Revy and Ginji, who pursue him and slaughter his cohorts while Rock rescues Yukio from his clutches. Once cornered by Revy, he was determined to fight her in a quickdraw showdown, only for her to kick him in the face, humiliating him, before luring him into fighting Ginji instead, who quickly disarmed him and finished him off by severing his arms and drowning him in a pool. His character and appearance is likely based on Kakihara from Ichi the killer, as both of them have bleached hair, are longing for a strong opponent equal to them, and are sadistically violent. He is possibly based on a presumably-existing Kudo-kai member hanging around Harajuku.

The Lovelace Family 
The Lovelace Family are one of the 13 prominent South American families, and their origin is from Venezuela. However, the family has come under hard times from not only their peers due to their political beliefs, but also from the Colombian Cartel, which has been harassing employees of the family in order to take control of their land. However, because of Diego Lovelace's military and political connections, the family is constantly protected from threats. In addition, the family includes Roberta (aka Rosarita Cisneros), a former FARC terrorist who is wanted by both the Cartel and various law enforcement agencies. Because of her close relationship with the family, she is accepted as one of their own, serving as maid and, if necessary, bodyguard. Another maid, who is combat ready like Roberta, is Fabiola Igesias.

Diego Jose San Fernando Lovelace 

 was the former head of the Lovelace family, eleventh in succession. While it is one of the thirteen noble families of South America, the Lovelace family fell upon hard times, with only the meager income from their plantations maintaining their lifestyle. He took in Rosarita Cisneros, when she was escaping from the Colombian Cartel as a favor to his old friend, Rosarita's father. He took her in and treated her as family. In 1995, he was assassinated during a speech due to the fact his political beliefs were seen as a threat by many. This event makes Roberta take up the "Bloodhound" persona once more.

Garcia Lovelace 

 is the only son of Diego Jose San Fernando Lovelace, was heir to the Lovelace family line, and as such, is its current head, the twelfth in succession after his father was assassinated. He was kidnapped for a short while by a Colombian cartel and was transported by the Lagoon Company as "goods". He and Roberta left Roanapur shortly afterwards, with some help from Hotel Moscow. He has apparently returned to Roanapur searching for Roberta with a new maid named Fabiola, waiting in a local hotel called the "Sunken Palace Hotel" and seemed to have matured greatly in terms of emotional strength, as commented by Rock, since his last appearance. He treats both Roberta and Fabiola as if they were his extended family and in return, both care for him equally. He requests help to find Roberta from Lagoon Company with additional help from Chang, Shenhua, Sawyer, and Lotton. However, the only person he truly trusts in Roanapur is Rock. To stop Roberta, Garcia comes up with the most drastic plan to fake Caxton's death with his own hands, thus taking away Roberta's "Path of Justice"; this causes her to hallucinate once more and shoot him. Her consequent horror finally snaps her out of her insanity. In the aftermath, Chang told Rock that the Lovelace family will still have a hard road ahead of them in future.

Roberta 

 is a Colombian maid who worked for four years at the Lovelace household in Venezuela. Although her domestic skills such as cleaning and cooking were poor, she developed a close friendship with the young son of the Lovelace family, Garcia. Balalaika refers her as a "hardcore terrorist" to the point that Hotel Moscow had to deploy all their commandos as well as Balalaika getting involved in the situation personally should things get out of hand. Revy refers to her as "Fucking Four Eyes" or "That Fucking Glasses Bitch". She earned the moniker "Bloodhound of Florencia" for her relentless drive to achieve her objectives. Her tormented past and the smell of blood, gunpowder and muck like that of a sewer rat emanating from her was something Revy understood full well.

In combat, Roberta is a truly fearsome opponent, having trained in a wide variety of martial, stealth, and weapon skills. Among the weapons she has used were a .50 caliber Barrett M82, SPAS-12 shotgun disguised as an umbrella (reinforced with Kevlar), machine gun, and semi-automatic grenade launcher hidden in a suitcase, Trench knife, and twin IMBEL Model 1911 pistols (see Colt M1911 pistols). Her strength, speed, endurance, and instincts were honed to almost superhuman levels, so much so that Rock at one point refers to her sardonically as "a killer robot from the future" (a reference to James Cameron's Terminator movies). At one point in the manga she was also described as the only person worthy of inheriting the title "Jackal" from Carlos.

While Roberta is one of the most powerful warrior-women in Black Lagoon, she is also highly conscientious. She is unwaveringly devoted to her master and his son, Garcia, whom she loves deeply. Roberta and Revy fight each other, but only to beat themselves up. Rock interferes, but Roberta and Revy tell him to stay out of it. In the manga and anime, the fight ends in a draw right after they punch each other out simultaneously (though Garcia claims she won because she remained conscious). Her kindness can easily change as seen in a humorous omake in Volume 1 of the manga when Garcia slapped her butt in a playful manner, which prompted her to pinch his arm and lift him up off the ground by the skin of his arm as punishment.

She admitted that she did murder children, women, or anyone in name of revolution during her FARC years. Disillusioned by the fact that she was merely a tool for the drug cartels in cahoots with FARC, she opted out and joined the Lovelace clan as a maid through her father who was a good friend of Diego Lovelace. Despite being asked by Garcia not to pick up gunfighting anymore, later events in the manga, which depicts her watching helplessly as a bomb was set killing many including Diego Lovelace. Garcia's question of why his father was a victim makes her go into battle again, seeking revenge. Roberta's anger almost pushed her to the limit; she is shown taking mouthfuls of anti-psychotics, and experiencing haunting hallucinations in the form of her past victim (Japanese engineer). She once again stalks the city of Roanapur in search of the one responsible for assassinating her master. Unfortunately, it turns out to be the US Special Forces. Roberta's quest for vengeance has put many of the residents including Hotel Moscow, the Triad, and the Colombian Cartel on high alert as it could mean the end for all of them if their new enemy is the United States. Most of the residents blame the Lagoon Company for attracting her back to Roanapur despite the fact the group was in the dark about the situation and brushed it off as if it were an Elvis sighting. Further into her quest, she begins to lose sight of her goal, almost returning to her former persona to the point she begins to lose her sanity and has trouble identifying friend and foe, thus almost harming Garcia in the process. The FARC commander even comments that she is no longer the hound they once knew, but a diseased stray wolf searching for purpose. Her oath as the "Bloodhound of Florencia" is "In the name of Santa Maria, a hammer blow of righteousness to all injustice."

In Chapter 73, Roberta is seen with an American woman, presumably Eda, passing through airport security to continue her pursuit of the Americans. She finally catches up with Grey Fox and kills 8-9 soldiers (there were 18 soldiers in three groups: Alpha, Bravo and Charlie), but Caxton himself is shot by Garcia in the hope she will give up her thirst for revenge. A still hallucinating Roberta then reflexively shoots Garcia when he turns his gun on her, but her horror at her attack at last restores her sanity. Garcia's gun is in fact loaded only with blanks, and Caxton survives; Garcia himself suffers only minor injuries.

In the extra missing pages of chapter 76, she and Garcia kissed and they made up with each other and returns to the Lovelace home. However exclusive to the anime, in the fifth episode of the OVA, Roberta is severely injured and is confined to a wheelchair as she later regains the ability to walk slowly (she has lost her left arm, her right eye, has a prosthetic foot and ankle, implying her lower right leg has been amputated as well). In the anime's ending, she is seen taking Garcia's hand and walking towards the family of the Japanese engineer, who Caxton brought to meet her.

In issue #50 of Anime Insider magazine, director Sunao Katabuchi comments that the animation staff referred Roberta as an "Evil Mary Poppins". He goes on to add that creator Rei Hiroe long thought of Roberta as a kind of "Death Poppins".

Fabiola Iglesias 

 is a young maid in the employ of the Lovelace family. She is one of the maids who work as Roberta's subordinates, and the only other combat-trained person among the maids apart from Roberta herself. In combat, she prefers to use two MAG-7s that were given to her by Roberta. She also carries a pump action China Lake NATIC (Mistakenly referred to as an EX 41 grenade launcher in the Manga). She also has heel blades concealed in her shoes. She is the same age with Garcia.

Fabiola first appears in the same bar, The Yellow Flag, that Roberta met the Lagoon crew in, panicking everybody with her resemblance to Roberta. However, unlike Roberta, her suitcase is revealed to be filled with lollipops and a lunchbox with Scooby Doo and Ranger Smith on it. She is currently helping Garcia search for Roberta. She is something of a comic relief when compared with Roberta (whom she calls "head housemaid" with the utmost respect), as she is little, carries her grenade launcher concealed in her outfit, and is often prominent in humorous situations; such as her height, being picked up like a bratty little kid, to being made fun of her breast size.

Dutch describes her as a "short version of the Killer Maid", after she destroys Bao's bar. She states that she comes from the poorest slums of Caracas, where she lived with her ten siblings until she was employed by the Lovelace Family. As noticed by Rock, she does not brawl, being a proficient practitioner of capoeira. According to her, she and Roberta are the only two maids in the Lovelace house who are proficient in firearms, with Roberta being the better of the two. She also mentions that there are three other maids in the Lovelace house: Karina, Masica and Davia (though it's unknown at this time if they're combat proficient as well). This makes Revy question her "Just what is the Lovelace plantation like? Full of bad-ass motherfuckers who could storm the Iranian embassy by themselves?". Fabiola was disgusted at Revy for being heartless and merciless against her foes, with Revy lecturing her that love and friendship do not apply in Roanapur. She and Garcia are reunited with Roberta; but the happiness is short lived when she and Roberta witness Garcia shooting Caxton with a 1911 Colt .45 filled with blanks and in retaliation Roberta shoots Garcia. She and Roberta then tend to a wounded Garcia. On their way back, they encountered Rock and Fabiola gets upset and disgusted with him and shot him with a blank round which injured Rock's ribs for "gambling with people's lives". She told Rock they will not meet again and that he shall "continue to dance with the walking dead in Roanapur." In the anime, she is shown to continue working at the Lovelace manor.

Just like Roberta, Fabiola is very protective of Garcia. She is more brash than her mentor, but not as much as Revy. She tries to attack Chang after seeing him with Garcia, but he easily disarms her without trying. She loves to play in the pool when she's relaxing, but is embarrassed to ask Garcia for a break, despite the fact he is aware of her activities.

Other characters 
The following are the other characters of this anime:

Kageyama 

 is one of the department chiefs of Asahi Industries, based in Tokyo. He was entrusted by its board of directors to ensure that their illegal activities were not exposed. Kageyama betrayed Rock by appointing Captain to kill him and the Lagoon Company, thus encouraging Rock to stay on with the Lagoon Company. Although Kageyama is married and has three children (consisting of one teenage son, one teenage daughter, and one pre-teen daughter), he seems to place more emphasis on his job than on his family.

Hänsel and Gretel 
Hänsel 
Gretel 

Hänsel and Gretel (also known as Fratele Meu (Romanian for "my brother") and Sora Mea ("my sister")) are two Romanian twin orphans. They were abandoned in a state-run orphanage as their parents' could not afford to look after them, following the overthrow of Nicolae Ceaușescu, before being sold to black market. As a result of being repeatedly forced to participate in paedophilic snuff films in which they are either raped or forced to murder other children, and being repeatedly forced to watch the orphanage workers beat children to death, the twins eventually became deranged, sadistic killers. The horrid engrossment with their torturing and murdering for pleasure is shown during the first part of Season 2 when the twins first arrive to Roanupor and  purposely wound one of Balalaika's men during a gunfight, bring him back to their temporary stay with Verrocchio's headquarters, probe his body with sharp objects as a medical experiment, and then drain his body of blood and organs for them to bathe in; afterwards they kill Verrocchio and his men out of indulgence, even though they were supposed to help them escape the city. Unknown to most people, "Hänsel" and "Gretel" are actually two personalities alternately adopted by the two children, both of whom suffer from dissociative identity disorder, meaning they swap being "Hänsel" and "Gretel" with each other from time to time (it is likely that these were their screen names in the films). There are slight implications that they could be incestuous, possibly due to the abuse they suffered in the state-run orphanage. It is never made clear of what gender the twins are: in one scene, "Gretel" (formerly "Hänsel" before swapping) shows 'her' genitalia to Rock in what she presumably came to believe was a show of gratitude, causing him to flee in disgust and horror at how utterly broken “Gretel” was, having known nothing but 'blood and darkness' their whole lives.

In combat, "Hänsel" wields a sharp battle axe while "Gretel" uses a M1918 Browning Automatic Rifle that appears to be taller than 'she' is. Both also carry additional sidearms. While they were mentally deranged, Hänsel and Gretel were also cunning, having used two other children as decoys to distract the bounty hunters and using money to distract Eda. They were also not above using their innocent appearance to deceive their enemies.

As revenge for killing Balalaika's men, "Hänsel" is lured into a hunt across the city for Hotel Moscow's forces, until he locates Balalaika herself at a fountain, where he is abruptly gunned down by her snipers. Balalaika then coldly talks him down and leaves him to bleed out from his wounds. "Gretel" manages to escape and eventually boards the Black Lagoon of her own volition. Due to Rock's kindness, she takes a genuine liking to him. However, just as "Gretel" disembarks, she is gunned down by the getaway man Dutch contacted, who was bribed by Hotel Moscow. Though initially shocked by her sudden death, Rock is glad that now "she" and "her brother" could rest in peace.

The characters' names are taken from the German fairy tale, Hänsel and Gretel. Many of the series' characters compare them to a similar pair of disturbed, sadistic twins from the American film The Shining. In the manga, the song sung by Gretel to Rock on the Black Lagoon is called "Midnight, the Stars and You", the song used in the ending credits to The Shining. In the anime, she sings "The World of Midnight", made for the anime and sung by Minako Obata.

Greenback Jane 

She served as the leader for her project team, which was spread around the world but was connected thanks to the internet, and is quite knowledgeable on the details of the dollar bill. Coincidentally, she falls in love with Benny after he displays his hacking skills. Janet currently has a long-distance relationship with Benny. One of the running gags of her story arc is her clumsiness and poor luck, which usually result in her being subject to a pantyshot. After the Lovelace incident, Janet returns to Roanapur searching out Benny and the team. She, with help of her counterfeiting group, hacks a server of the "Rainbach AG" Corporation and makes a scapegoat of a PLA spy. Jane is apparently a nymphomaniac, though Benny calls it "a bit broad-minded as far as sex goes". Revy replies that "if that's "a bit", then Death Valley is a sand pit in a park".

Russell 

 is a middle-aged American man who works for the Florida crime syndicate that's tracking Jane. He is quite distinguishable, since he dresses like a cowboy: he has the trademark hat, boots with spurs, a revolver at the hip, bandolier belt, tan shirt and jeans. He is not taken seriously by the other bounty hunters because he is an outsider. Even Shenhua says, "Cowboy, this no Florida", meaning that he is in over his head. However, his skills are shown to be more than everyone thought, when he is the last bounty hunter left in the hunt for Jane and he duels Eda on board the Lagoon. It is then later revealed that he and Eda have met previously in the United States, although she says they have never met. Shortly before killing him, she confesses to him to be from the CIA.

Vasili Laptev 

 is the boss of a branch of the Russian mafia that is based in Tokyo. A former KGB officer, Laptev had many difficulties operating in Japan due to his status as a gaijin (foreigner). Considered distasteful and incompetent by Balalaika, he appeared to lose his standing with his peers back in Russia and this was reflected in his arrogant personality, since he did not speak Japanese despite being based in Japan. Laptev's detachment is slaughtered single-handedly by Ginji when the fallout between Hotel Moscow and the Washimine-gumi begins.

Masami Kousa 

Head of the Kousa Council. In past both Washimine and Kousa Yakuza's were allies as Yukio's father and Masami's "brother" were blood brothers. When they both died and Masami took over, any relationship the two groups had were gone and the Kousa's mistreated the Washime group badly to the point that Masami wouldn't recognize Yukio as the heir to the Washimine group and wanted someone in his group to take over. His mistreatment led the Washime group to call Hotel Moscow to weaken them. In the end of Fujiyama Gangsters arc, Masami was about to form an alliance with Hotel Moscow when Balalaika, after talking with Rock, decided to kill him and his lieutenants cited she wouldn't want to work with a group with such poor merchandise.

Maki 

 is a female high school junior and goes to the same high school as her friend, Yukio Washimine prior to her rise to leadership of the Washimine Group. Both of them tearfully parted ways as Yukio planned to sever all ties to her former life. Maki seems to be a symbolic representative of the typical Japanese high school girl who is interested in skin-care, has a part-time job, reads light novels, and has poor school grades.

Feng Yifei/Li Xinlin 
 is a Chinese hacker in the People's Liberation Army. She is assigned to infiltrate Greenback Jane's group under the alias . However, Jane and the other hacker are aware of this and use her to tap into the PLA's computers. When this is discovered, Li's superiors believed she was a traitor and put a contract on her life to Roanapur-based mercenaries. She is the subject of the Wild Red Wild Card arc of the manga, eventually being protected by Rock and Revy. She ultimately is saved from a group of PLA-hired hitmen by gaining the protection of the Italian mafia and laundering their money. Feng forms a new life in Roanapur in this role, meeting with Rock in the subsequent arc. She kisses him several times throughout her appearances, though they have not yet started a relationship.

References

External links 
 YouTube
 Crunchyroll
 Funimation

Black Lagoon
Black Lagoon